In mathematics, the Gibbs phenomenon, discovered by   and rediscovered by , is the oscillatory behavior of the Fourier series of a piecewise continuously differentiable periodic function around a jump discontinuity. The function's th partial Fourier series (formed by summing its  lowest constituent sinusoids) produces large peaks around the jump which overshoot and undershoot the function's actual values. This approximation error approaches a limit of about 9% of the jump as more sinusoids are used, though the infinite Fourier series sum does eventually converge almost everywhere except the point of discontinuity.

The Gibbs phenomenon was observed by experimental physicists, but was believed to be due to imperfections in the measuring apparatus, and it is one cause of ringing artifacts in signal processing.

Description

The Gibbs phenomenon involves both the fact that Fourier sums overshoot at a jump discontinuity, and that this overshoot does not die out as more sinusoidal terms are added.

The three pictures on the right demonstrate the phenomenon for a square wave (of height ) whose Fourier series is

As more sinusoidal terms are added, the error of the partial Fourier series converges to a fixed height. But because the width of the error continues to narrow, the area of the error – and hence the energy of the error – converges to 0. Deriving the formula of the limit of the error for the square wave reveals that the error exceeds the height of the square wave  by
()

or about 9% of the jump. At the discontinuity, the partial Fourier series will converge to the midpoint of the jump (regardless of the actual value of the original function at the discontinuity). The quantity
()
is sometimes known as the Wilbraham–Gibbs constant.

History 
The Gibbs phenomenon was first noticed and analyzed by Henry Wilbraham in an 1848 paper. The paper attracted little attention until 1914 when it was mentioned in Heinrich Burkhardt's review of mathematical analysis in Klein's encyclopedia. In 1898, Albert A. Michelson developed a device that could compute and re-synthesize the Fourier series. A widespread myth says that when the Fourier coefficients for a square wave were input to the machine, the graph would oscillate at the discontinuities, and that because it was a physical device subject to manufacturing flaws, Michelson was convinced that the overshoot was caused by errors in the machine. In fact the graphs produced by the machine were not good enough to exhibit the Gibbs phenomenon clearly, and Michelson may not have noticed it as he made no mention of this effect in his paper  about his machine or his later letters to Nature.

Inspired by correspondence in Nature between Michelson and A. E. H. Love about the convergence of the Fourier series of the square wave function, J. Willard Gibbs published a note in 1898 pointing out the important distinction between the limit of the graphs of the partial sums of the Fourier series of a sawtooth wave and the graph of the limit of those partial sums. In his first letter Gibbs failed to notice the Gibbs phenomenon, and the limit that he described for the graphs of the partial sums was inaccurate. In 1899 he published a correction in which he described the overshoot at the point of discontinuity (Nature, April 27, 1899, p. 606). In 1906, Maxime Bôcher gave a detailed mathematical analysis of that overshoot, coining the term "Gibbs phenomenon" and bringing the term into widespread use.

After the existence of Henry Wilbraham's paper became widely known, in 1925 Horatio Scott Carslaw remarked, "We may still call this property of Fourier's series (and certain other series) Gibbs's phenomenon; but we must no longer claim that the property was first discovered by Gibbs."

Explanation 
Informally, the Gibbs phenomenon reflects the difficulty inherent in approximating a discontinuous function by a finite series of continuous sinusoidal waves. It is important to put emphasis on the word finite, because even though every partial sum of the Fourier series overshoots around each discontinuity it is approximating, the limit of summing an infinite number of sinusoidal waves does not. The overshoot peaks moves closer and closer to the discontinuity as more terms are summed, so convergence is possible.

There is no contradiction (between the overshoot error converging to a non-zero height even though the infinite sum has no overshoot), because the overshoot peaks move toward the discontinuity. The Gibbs phenomenon thus exhibits pointwise convergence, but not uniform convergence. For a piecewise continuously differentiable (class C1) function, the Fourier series converges to the function at every point except at jump discontinuities. At jump discontinuities, the infinite sum will converge to the jump discontinuity's midpoint (i.e. the average of the values of the function on either side of the jump), as a consequence of Dirichlet's theorem.

The Gibbs phenomenon is closely related to the principle that the smoothness of a function controls the decay rate of its Fourier coefficients. Fourier coefficients of smoother functions will more rapidly decay (resulting in faster convergence), whereas Fourier coefficients of discontinuous functions will slowly decay (resulting in slower convergence).

This only provides a partial explanation of the Gibbs phenomenon, since Fourier series with absolutely convergent Fourier coefficients would be uniformly convergent by the Weierstrass M-test and would thus be unable to exhibit the above oscillatory behavior. By the same token, it is impossible for a discontinuous function to have absolutely convergent Fourier coefficients, since the function would thus be the uniform limit of continuous functions and therefore be continuous, a contradiction. See .

Solutions 
In practice, the difficulties associated with the Gibbs phenomenon can be ameliorated by using a smoother method of Fourier series summation, such as Fejér summation or Riesz summation, or by using sigma-approximation. Using a continuous wavelet transform, the wavelet Gibbs phenomenon never exceeds the Fourier Gibbs phenomenon. Also, using the discrete wavelet transform with Haar basis functions, the Gibbs phenomenon does not occur at all in the case of continuous data at jump discontinuities, and is minimal in the discrete case at large change points. In wavelet analysis, this is commonly referred to as the Longo phenomenon. In the polynomial interpolation setting, the Gibbs phenomenon can be mitigated using the S-Gibbs algorithm.

Formal mathematical description of the phenomenon 
Let  be a piecewise continuously differentiable function which is periodic with some period .  Suppose that at some point , the left limit  and right limit  of the function  differ by a non-zero jump of :

For each positive integer  ≥ 1, let  be the th partial Fourier series

where the Fourier coefficients  are given by the usual formulae

Then we have

and

but

and

Signal processing explanation 

From a signal processing point of view, the Gibbs phenomenon is the step response of a low-pass filter, and the oscillations are called ringing or ringing artifacts. Truncating the Fourier transform of a signal on the real line, or the Fourier series of a periodic signal (equivalently, a signal on the circle), corresponds to filtering out the higher frequencies with an ideal (brick-wall) low-pass filter. This can be represented as convolution of the original signal with the impulse response of the filter (also known as the kernel), which is the sinc function. Thus the Gibbs phenomenon can be seen as the result of convolving a Heaviside step function (if periodicity is not required) or a square wave (if periodic) with a sinc function: the oscillations in the sinc function cause the ripples in the output.

In the case of convolving with a Heaviside step function, the resulting function is exactly the integral of the sinc function, the sine integral; for a square wave the description is not as simply stated. For the step function, the magnitude of the undershoot is thus exactly the integral of the left tail until the first negative zero: for the normalized sinc of unit sampling period, this is  The overshoot is accordingly of the same magnitude: the integral of the right tail or (equivalently) the difference between the integral from negative infinity to the first positive zero minus 1 (the non-overshooting value).

The overshoot and undershoot can be understood thus: kernels are generally normalized to have integral 1, so they result in a mapping of constant functions to constant functions – otherwise they have gain. The value of a convolution at a point is a linear combination of the input signal, with coefficients (weights) the values of the kernel.

If a kernel is non-negative, such as for a Gaussian kernel, then the value of the filtered signal will be a convex combination of the input values (the coefficients (the kernel) integrate to 1, and are non-negative), and will thus fall between the minimum and maximum of the input signal – it will not undershoot or overshoot. If, on the other hand, the kernel assumes negative values, such as the sinc function, then the value of the filtered signal will instead be an affine combination of the input values, and may fall outside of the minimum and maximum of the input signal, resulting in undershoot and overshoot, as in the Gibbs phenomenon.

Taking a longer expansion – cutting at a higher frequency – corresponds in the frequency domain to widening the brick-wall, which in the time domain corresponds to narrowing the sinc function and increasing its height by the same factor, leaving the integrals between corresponding points unchanged. This is a general feature of the Fourier transform: widening in one domain corresponds to narrowing and increasing height in the other. This results in the oscillations in sinc being narrower and taller, and (in the filtered function after convolution) yields oscillations that are narrower (and thus with smaller area) but which do not have reduced magnitude: cutting off at any finite frequency results in a sinc function, however narrow, with the same tail integrals. This explains the persistence of the overshoot and undershoot.

Thus the features of the Gibbs phenomenon are interpreted as follows:
 the undershoot is due to the impulse response having a negative tail integral, which is possible because the function takes negative values;
 the overshoot offsets this, by symmetry (the overall integral does not change under filtering);
 the persistence of the oscillations is because increasing the cutoff narrows the impulse response, but does not reduce its integral – the oscillations thus move towards the discontinuity, but do not decrease in magnitude.

The square wave example 

Because the case of odd  is very similar, let us just deal with the case when  is even:

Substituting , we obtain

as claimed above. Next, we compute

If we introduce the normalized sinc function, we can rewrite this as

But the expression in square brackets is a Riemann sum approximation to the integral  (more precisely, it is a midpoint rule approximation with spacing ). Thus we have

which was what was claimed in the previous section.  A similar computation shows

Consequences
The Gibbs phenomenon is undesirable because it causes artifacts, namely clipping from the overshoot and undershoot, and ringing artifacts from the oscillations. In the case of low-pass filtering, these can be reduced or eliminated by using different low-pass filters.

In MRI, the Gibbs phenomenon causes artifacts in the presence of adjacent regions of markedly differing signal intensity. This is most commonly encountered in spinal MRIs where the Gibbs phenomenon may simulate the appearance of syringomyelia.

The Gibbs phenomenon manifests as a cross pattern artifact in the discrete Fourier transform of an image, where most images (e.g. micrographs or photographs) have a sharp discontinuity between boundaries at the top / bottom and left / right of an image. When periodic boundary conditions are imposed in the Fourier transform, this jump discontinuity is represented by continuum of frequencies along the axes in reciprocal space (i.e. a cross pattern of intensity in the Fourier transform).

And although this article mainly focused on the difficulty with trying to construct discontinuities without artifacts in the time domain with only a partial Fourier series, it is also important to consider that because the inverse Fourier transform is extremely similar to the Fourier transform, there equivalently is difficulty with trying to construct discontinuities in the frequency domain using only a partial Fourier series. Thus for instance because idealized brick-wall and rectangular filters have discontinuities in the frequency domain, their exact representation in the time domain necessarily requires an infinitely-long sinc filter impulse response, since a finite impulse response will result in Gibbs rippling in the frequency response near cut-off frequencies, though this rippling can be reduced by windowing finite impulse response filters (at the expense of wider transition bands).

See also
 Mach bands
 Pinsky phenomenon
 Runge's phenomenon (a similar phenomenon in polynomial approximations)
 σ-approximation which adjusts a Fourier summation to eliminate the Gibbs phenomenon which would otherwise occur at discontinuities
 Sine integral

Notes

References

  Volume 1, Volume 2.

 Paul J. Nahin, Dr. Euler's Fabulous Formula, Princeton University Press, 2006.  Ch. 4, Sect. 4.

External links

 
 Weisstein, Eric W., "Gibbs Phenomenon". From MathWorld—A Wolfram Web Resource.
 Prandoni, Paolo, "Gibbs Phenomenon".
 Radaelli-Sanchez, Ricardo, and Richard Baraniuk, "Gibbs Phenomenon". The Connexions Project. (Creative Commons Attribution License)
Horatio S Carslaw : Introduction to the theory of Fourier's series and integrals.pdf (introductiontot00unkngoog.pdf ) at archive.org
 A Python implementation of the S-Gibbs algorithm mitigating the Gibbs Phenomenon https://github.com/pog87/FakeNodes.

Real analysis
Fourier series
Numerical artefacts